Pat O'Malley (September 3, 1890 – May 21, 1966) was an American vaudeville and stage performer prior to starting a prolific film career at the age of sixteen. He later had a career in television.

Career
O'Malley was born as Patrick Henry O'Malley, Jr. in Forest City, Pennsylvania. He had circus experience by the time he discovered an interest in motion pictures. His screen career dates from the days of Kalem and Edison Studios. From 1918 to 1927 he appeared in scores of silent films as both a leading man and a character actor i.e.: The Heart of Humanity, My Wild Irish Rose, The Virginian and in the adaptation of bestseller Brothers Under the Skin.

O'Malley saw his career decline with the advent of sound. He was quickly relegated to supporting parts, and appeared in some four-hundred films in bit parts and supporting roles. He guest starred in the early musical series Faye Emerson's Wonderful Town on CBS. O'Malley remained on call into the early 1960s for such TV shows as The Twilight Zone and such films as Days of Wine and Roses.

Family
In 1915 O'Malley married actress Lillian Wilkes (died December 15, 1976). The couple had three childrden, Sheila, Eileen and Kathleen. O'Malley had a brother Charles O'Malley (1897-1958) who was an actor and assistant director.

Death
O'Malley died of a heart attack in 1966 at age seventy five. His interment was at San Fernando Mission Cemetery.

Partial filmography

The Picture of Dorian Gray (1916)
The Love That Lives (1916)
Hit-The-Trail Holliday (1918)
The Prussian Cur (1918)
The Red Glove (1919)
The Prospector's Vengeance (1920)
The Breath of the Gods (1920)
A Game Chicken (1922)
The Virginian (1923)
Brass (1923)
The Mine with the Iron Door (1924)
The Beauty Prize (1924)
Happiness (1924)
Bread (1924)
Proud Flesh (1925)
The White Desert (1925)
The Teaser (1925)
Spangles (1926)
Pleasure Before Business (1927)
The Man I Love (1929)
The Fall Guy (1930)
The Fighting Marshal (1931)
High Speed (1932)
The Shadow of the Eagle (1932)
Those We Love (1932)
Frisco Jenny (1932)
The Whirlwind (1933)
The Fighting Marines (1935)
The Roaring Twenties (1939)
Law of the Range (1941)
The Wild One (1953)

References

External links

IMDb

1890 births
1966 deaths
Male actors from Pennsylvania
American male film actors
American male silent film actors
Deaths from myocarditis
American people of Irish descent
People from Susquehanna County, Pennsylvania
Vaudeville performers
Burials at San Fernando Mission Cemetery
20th-century American male actors